Wrocław is a Polish parliamentary constituency in the Lower Silesian Voivodeship.  It elects fourteen members of the Sejm.

The district has the number '3' and is named after the city of Wrocław.  It includes the counties of Góra, Milicz, Oleśnica, Oława, Strzelin, Środa Śląska, Skarżysko, Wołów, and Wrocław, and the city county of Wrocław.

List of members

2019-2023

Footnotes

Electoral districts of Poland
Wrocław
Lower Silesian Voivodeship